Wyacondah Township is a township in Davis County, Iowa, USA.  As of the 2000 census, its population was 374.

History
Wyacondah Township was organized in 1846.

Geography
Wyacondah Township covers an area of 48.24 square miles (124.95 square kilometers); of this, 0.13 square miles (0.35 square kilometers) or 0.28 percent is water. The streams of Batten Branch and North Fabius Creek run through this township.

Unincorporated towns
 Lunsford
 Mark
 Savannah
(This list is based on USGS data and may include former settlements.)

Adjacent townships
 Bloomfield Township (northeast)
 Cleveland Township (northeast)
 Grove Township (east)
 Fabius Township (west)
 West Grove Township (northwest)

Cemeteries
The township contains thirteen cemeteries: Bragg, Bridwell, Davies, Dooley, Fenton, Howell, Inskeep, Kelley, Morgan, Savannah, Small, Sullivan and Wesley Chapel.

Major highways
 U.S. Route 63

References
 U.S. Board on Geographic Names (GNIS)
 United States Census Bureau cartographic boundary files

External links
 US-Counties.com
 City-Data.com

Townships in Davis County, Iowa
Townships in Iowa